Major-General Sir John Davis  (27 April 1832 – 5 October 1901) was an Irish officer in the British Army who became General Officer Commanding the Southern District.

Early life and education
Davis was the son of John Davis, of the Park, Rathfarnham, County Dublin, and his wife, Martha. He was baptised at St Andrew's Catholic Church. He was educated at Cheltenham College.

Military career
Davis was commissioned as an ensign in the 35th (Royal Sussex) Regiment of Foot in 1852 and saw action during the Indian Rebellion in 1857. He was present at the First and Second Battles of El Teb in February 1884 and commanded the 2nd Brigade at the Battle of Tamai in March 1884 during the Mahdist War. He became Commander of the troops at Malta in 1884, Commander of the 1st Infantry Brigade at Malta in April 1886 and General Officer Commanding Dublin District in January 1888. He went on to be General Officer Commanding the Southern District, at Portsmouth, in November 1893 before retiring in November 1898.

In 1900 he was given the colonelcy of the Royal Sussex Regiment, which he held until his death the following year.

References

Sources

1832 births
1901 deaths
Military personnel from Dublin (city)
People educated at Cheltenham College
British Army major generals
Knights Commander of the Order of the Bath
Royal Sussex Regiment officers
People from Rathfarnham
British military personnel of the Indian Rebellion of 1857
British Army personnel of the Mahdist War